Myrne is an urban-type settlement in Skadovsk Raion, Kherson Oblast, southern Ukraine. Myrne hosts the administration of Myrne settlement hromada, one of the hromadas of Ukraine. It has a population of

Administrative status 
Until 18 July, 2020, Myrne belonged to Kalanchak Raion. The raion was abolished in July 2020 as part of the administrative reform of Ukraine, which reduced the number of raions of Kherson Oblast to five. The area of Kalanchak Raion was merged into Skadovsk Raion.

Economy

Transportation
Kalanchak railway station is located in Myrne. It is on the railway which used to connect Kherson with Dzhankoi; however, after the Russian annexation of Crimea in 2014, the trains only run as far as Vadim, close to the border with Crimea. There is infrequent passenger traffic.

The settlement has access to Highway M17, which runs northwest to Kherson and southeast to the border with Crimea.

See also 

 Russian occupation of Kherson Oblast

References

Urban-type settlements in Skadovsk Raion